Anando Brahma is a 2017 Indian Telugu-language comedy horror film written and directed by Mahi V Raghav, starring Tapasee Pannu, Srinivas Reddy, Shakalaka Shankar, and Vennela Kishore. Produced by Vijay Chilla and Shashi Devireddy, the film has music composed by K.

The film released on August 18, 2017, to positive reviews. The film is remade in Tamil as Petromax (2019), Bengali as Bhootchakra Pvt. Ltd. (2019) and Kannada as Mane Maratakkide (2019). It went on to be an inspiration for another Kannada film Damayanthi (2019) and also for a Pakistani film  Lafangey  (2022).

Plot
Deepa, Taapsee, Vijayachander and Raghu are ghosts staying in their ancestral house. They are shown to be waiting for the wife of Vijayachander to come home. They don't know how they were killed. A family visits their house for tenancy but they scare the family away. The broker, who deals with the house, is also scared as he spots the ghost of Taapsee and informs their presence to the house owner Ramu, an NRI and his cop friend Vamshi. Vamshi is apprehensive while Ramu dismisses it as a concoction while in real, Vamshi connives with Yadagiri to force Ramu to sell his house at a throwaway price by fabricating and peddling the ghost story. 

Sidhu overhears their conversation and makes a deal with Ramu that he would be sending his three friends to stay one night at the house and if they survived, Ramu would pay some part of the sale price to Sidhu as commission. But his three friends encounter the ghosts that night. One of them  is locked in the bathroom, his friend (Jeeva) is knocked unconscious and another is scared away. Ramu is convinced that there are ghosts and is about to sell it at the price demanded by Yadagiri. But Ramu after being urged by Sidhu, gives him one last chance to prove that the house is not haunted. Sidhu and his friend Tulasi meet Babu and Raju coincidentally and all are in desperate need of money. Sidhu has to take care of his amnesiac mother and needs to have a heart surgery to overcome the problem of hole in his heart. Babu, who is so infatuated by movies that he starts enacting the role he watches, is duped by Bharani who posed himself as an agent of famous cinema producers in Tollywood. Tulasi, a drunkard who drinks only after the clock ticks 9 in the night, in an inebriated state bets on a cricket match and loses his money that he saved for his son's surgery. Raju is deaf and night-blind who often uses his flute when frightened. He is embroiled in a robbery case after an ATM he was guarding was looted and he was caught napping in CCTV. The security agency that hired him tells him to repay the money lost to prevent the agency from getting banned.
 
As they start staying in the house, all the ghosts decide to scare them away. However, all the four friends manage to stay not scared due to their peculiar habits, and instead start intimidating the ghosts. After the first day, Ramu inquires with Sidhu about the presence of ghosts and decides to give him two more days to finally sell the house. Vamshi does not like Sidhu and his group staying inside the house and sends fake ghosts to scare them away. However, the fake ghosts are frightened away by the real ghosts. On the second night too, Sidhu and his group too manage to stay calm and manage to scare the ghosts. However, on the third night, the ghosts frighten the group and are about to kill them when Sidhu's mother comes to the house looking for him. She is none other than Vijayachander's wife and in a flashback, reveals that Ramu is their son. Taapsee and Deepa have been adopted by the couple. Ramu incurs loss in a business and to cover for the losses, he intends to sell the house. Vijayachander refuses to sell the house which infuriates Ramu and kills all of the family members except his mother. The ghosts realise the reasons for their death and enact their revenge by killing Ramu. Sidhu and group while leaving the house find a cash-laden bag in the car of Ramu and take them away. They convert that house into an old age home and live happily with Taapsee's mother and some other old members who are abandoned by their children.

Cast 

 Taapsee Pannu as Ghost
 Srinivas Reddy as Sidhu 
 Shakalaka Shankar as Babu
 Vennela Kishore as Raju
 Vidyullekha Raman
 Supreeth Reddy as Shankar
 Thagubothu Ramesh as Tulasi
 Rajiv Kanakala as Ramu
 Raja Ravindra as Inspector Vamshi
 Posani Krishna Murali as Inspector Krishna Manohar
 Vijayachander as House owner
 Jeeva as Paidithalli
 Shashank 
 Raghu Karumanchi as Maid
 Sivannarayana Naripeddi as Doctor
 Tanikella Bharani as Manikyam
 Chatrapathi Sekhar as Priest
 Sudheer Babu as himself; cameo appearance

Soundtrack 

Music is composed by K.

Release 
Anando Brahma released on 18 August 2017.

Reception

Box office 
Anando Brahma collected  Worldwide gross.

Critical reception 
Sangeetha Devi Dundoo of The Hindu wrote "Laugh-aloud moments apart, Anando Brahma is a simple story of a family and crime. Taapsee is a significant player in the drama and does her part effectively, but she’s not a show stealer. And that’s a good thing. A film needn’t always ride on star value". The Times of India gave 3 out of 5 stars stating "Four men find themselves in a house believed to be haunted and it's a delightful riot of comedy juxtaposed with horror". Firstpost gave 3.25 out of 5 stars stating "Anando Brahma has no frills attached to it and it’s pretty clear about what it wants to say, while avoiding several cliches associated with the genre. It reminded me of all those simple bed-time stories which we once heard from our grandparents, and Mahi V Raghav has brought that essence into the story-telling. It’s a simple film with a good dose of humour. Maybe the next time I go watch a horror film, I’ll end up smiling throughout its runtime or carry a flute along with me. Thank God, at least now, there’s one film which doesn’t suffer from horror-comedy fatigue".

Business Standard gave 3.5 out of 5 stars stating "Anando Brahma has its flaws, especially when we are not explained some actions of Rajeev Kanakala, but you can easily oversee it, thanks to the rib-tickling fun second half". The Indian Express gave 2 out of 5 stars stating "We have seen most of the paranormal activities of Anando Brahma in many other films in the past. The horror scenes hardly catch us by surprise, while comedy comes as a saving grace". Idlebrain.com gave 3 out of 5 stars stating "Anando Brahma partly works due to a few comedy episodes, but on other aspects it leaves a lot to be desired".

Sify gave 3.5 out of 5 stars stating "Anando Brahma largely works due to its hilarious moments in the second half. First half is regular stuff but it ends up as decent horror comedy as four comedians show their best in a 30 minutes episode in the post-interval sequences". IndiaGlitz gave 2.75 out of 5 stars stating "Anando Brahma comes into its own in the portions where the counter-intuitive element of humans scaring away ghosts comes to the fore.  Good performances, too, make it a decent entertainer.  The first half could have been much better on the comedy front".
Great Andhra gave 3 out of 5 stars stating "One can watch it for its comedy and second half. Among the recent horror comedies, this one is a bit different and has more laugh-out loud moments. It will appeal to audiences who are seeking some decent comedy".

Accolades
South Indian International Movie Awards
 Nominated - Best Debutant Director - Mahi V Raghav
 Nominated - Best Comedian - Srinivas Reddy
 Nominated - Best Comedian - Shakalaka Shankar

References

External links 
 

2017 films
2010s Telugu-language films
Indian comedy horror films
Films scored by K (composer)
Telugu films remade in other languages
Indian ghost films
2017 directorial debut films
70mm Entertainments films
2017 comedy horror films
Films directed by Mahi V Raghav